Martinsdale is a census-designated place in southeastern Meagher County, Montana, United States. The town was a station stop on the now-abandoned transcontinental main line of the Chicago, Milwaukee, St. Paul and Pacific Railroad ("the Milwaukee Road"), and is a community center for nearby ranches and farms. Martinsdale was the home of the poet Grace Stone Coates, author of Black Cherries, Mead & Mangel-Wurzel, and Portulacas in the Wheat. It was also the home of Charles M. Bair, one of the largest and most successful sheep ranchers in the United States, and the former Bair family home is now a museum.

The Gordon Butte Pumped Storage Project is a planned pumped hydroelectric power plant that will be constructed in Martinsdale.

Martinsdale is on Highway 294, just south of U.S. Route 12, and 44 miles east of White Sulphur Springs.

History
Originally named Gauglersville, the town changed to Martinsdale in 1878. The name was after Martin Maginnis, Montana Territory’s delegate to Congress, who assisted the town in getting a post office.

Notes

External links 
 Bair Family Museum

Census-designated places in Meagher County, Montana
Census-designated places in Montana
Hutterite communities in the United States
Protestantism in Montana